Prince Albert City was a provincial electoral district for the Legislative Assembly of the province of Saskatchewan, Canada. This constituency was one of 25 created for the 1st Saskatchewan general election in 1905.

Renamed Prince Albert in 1917, the district was dissolved before the 1967 Saskatchewan election and divided into Prince Albert West (later "Prince Albert-Duck Lake") and Prince Albert East-Cumberland. It is now part of the constituencies of Prince Albert Northcote and Prince Albert Carlton.

Members of the Legislative Assembly

Election results

|-

|Provincial Rights
|William Cowan
|align="right"|234
|align="right"|37.86%
|align="right"|–

|Independent
|William Thomas Gillmor
|align="right"|94
|align="right"|15.21%
|align="right"|–
|- bgcolor="white"
!align="left" colspan=3|Total
!align="right"|618
!align="right"|100.00%
!align="right"|

|-

|Provincial Rights
|John Ernest Bradshaw
|align="right"|366
|align="right"|45.92%
|align="right"|+8.06
|- bgcolor="white"
!align="left" colspan=3|Total
!align="right"|797
!align="right"|100.00%
!align="right"|

|-

|style="width: 130px"|Provincial Rights
|John Ernest Bradshaw
|align="right"|614
|align="right"|58.81%
|align="right"|+12.89

|- bgcolor="white"
!align="left" colspan=3|Total
!align="right"|1,044
!align="right"|100.00%
!align="right"|

|-

|style="width: 130px"|Conservative
|John Ernest Bradshaw
|align="right"|947
|align="right"|60.20%
|align="right"|+1.39

|- bgcolor="white"
!align="left" colspan=3|Total
!align="right"|1,573
!align="right"|100.00%
!align="right"|

|-

|Conservative
|John Ernest Bradshaw
|align="right"|1,089
|align="right"|32.87%
|align="right"|-27.33

|Independent
|John McLeod
|align="right"|118
|align="right"|3.56%
|align="right"|-
|- bgcolor="white"
!align="left" colspan=3|Total
!align="right"|3,313
!align="right"|100.00%
!align="right"|

|-

|- bgcolor="white"
!align="left" colspan=3|Total
!align="right"|Acclamation
!align="right"|

|-

|- bgcolor="white"
!align="left" colspan=3|Total
!align="right"|4,983
!align="right"|100.00%
!align="right"|

|-

|- bgcolor="white"
!align="left" colspan=3|Total
!align="right"|Acclamation
!align="right"|

|-

|Conservative
|John George Diefenbaker
|align="right"|3,163
|align="right"|46.92%
|align="right"|-
|- bgcolor="white"
!align="left" colspan=3|Total
!align="right"|6,741
!align="right"|100.00%
!align="right"|

|-

|Conservative
|Samuel J. A. Branion
|align="right"|2,007
|align="right"|23.08%
|align="right"|-23.84

|Farmer-Labour
|Edward Percy Spratt
|align="right"|1,215
|align="right"|13.97%
|align="right"|–
|- bgcolor="white"
!align="left" colspan=3|Total
!align="right"|8,696
!align="right"|100.00%
!align="right"|

|-

|Conservative
|Kennedy H. Palmer
|align="right"|2,227
|align="right"|20.58%
|align="right"|-2.50

|CCF
|John J.F. McIsaac
|align="right"|970
|align="right"|8.97%
|align="right"|-5.00
|- bgcolor="white"
!align="left" colspan=3|Total
!align="right"|10,818
!align="right"|100.00%
!align="right"|

|-

|- bgcolor="white"
!align="left" colspan=3|Total
!align="right"|Acclamation
!align="right"|

|-

|style="width: 130px"|CCF
|Larry McIntosh
|align="right"|6,178
|align="right"|59.12%
|align="right"|-

|Prog. Conservative
|Edgar P. Woodman
|align="right"|655
|align="right"|6.27%
|align="right"|-
|- bgcolor="white"
!align="left" colspan=3|Total
!align="right"|10,450
!align="right"|100.00%
!align="right"|

|-

|style="width: 130px"|CCF
|Larry McIntosh
|align="right"|6,944
|align="right"|51.15%
|align="right"|-7.97

|- bgcolor="white"
!align="left" colspan=3|Total
!align="right"|13,575
!align="right"|100.00%
!align="right"|

|-

|style="width: 130px"|CCF
|Larry McIntosh
|align="right"|6,107
|align="right"|54.50%
|align="right"|+3.35

|Prog. Conservative
|N.J. Bichan
|align="right"|683
|align="right"|6.09%
|align="right"|-
|- bgcolor="white"
!align="left" colspan=3|Total
!align="right"|11,206
!align="right"|100.00%
!align="right"|

|-

|style="width: 130px"|CCF
|Larry McIntosh
|align="right"|5,465
|align="right"|46.38%
|align="right"|-8.12

|- bgcolor="white"
!align="left" colspan=3|Total
!align="right"|11,783
!align="right"|100.00%
!align="right"|

|-

|style="width: 130px"|CCF
|Larry McIntosh
|align="right"|5,098
|align="right"|39.31%
|align="right"|-7.07

|Prog. Conservative
|Dale Yoos
|align="right"|2,353
|align="right"|18.15%
|align="right"|-

|- bgcolor="white"
!align="left" colspan=3|Total
!align="right"|12,968
!align="right"|100.00%
!align="right"|

|-

|CCF
|Joseph E. L. Lamontagne
|align="right"|4,928
|align="right"|39.81%
|align="right"|+0.50
|- bgcolor="white"
!align="left" colspan=3|Total
!align="right"|12,378
!align="right"|100.00%
!align="right"|

|-

|CCF
|Joseph E. L. Lamontagne
|align="right"|4,946
|align="right"|35.85%
|align="right"|-3.96

|Prog. Conservative
|Richard E. Spencer
|align="right"|3,828
|align="right"|27.74%
|align="right"|-
|- bgcolor="white"
!align="left" colspan=3|Total
!align="right"|13,798
!align="right"|100.00%
!align="right"|

See also 
Prince Albert - Northwest Territories electoral district (1870–1905).
Electoral district (Canada)
List of Saskatchewan provincial electoral districts
List of Saskatchewan general elections
List of political parties in Saskatchewan

References

 Saskatchewan Archives Board - Saskatchewan Election Results By Electoral Division

Former provincial electoral districts of Saskatchewan
Politics of Prince Albert, Saskatchewan